Amine Khammas (born 6 April 1999) is a professional footballer who plays as a left back for Apollon Limassol.

Career 
Khammas played with Genk as a junior. He made his first team debut with Genk in the Belgian Pro League on 29 July 2017 against Waasland-Beveren.

International career
Khammas was a youth international for Belgium at the U17 level. He later represented the Morocco U18s in a pair of friendlies against Portugal national under-18 football team in January 2017. He received a call-up to the senior Morocco national football team in August 2017.

Career statistics

References

External links
 

1999 births
Living people
Association football fullbacks
Moroccan footballers
Morocco youth international footballers
Belgian footballers
Belgium youth international footballers
Belgian sportspeople of Moroccan descent
K.R.C. Genk players
FC Den Bosch players
Lommel S.K. players
S.K. Beveren players
Belgian Pro League players
Challenger Pro League players
Eerste Divisie players
Expatriate sportspeople in the Netherlands